GAA Beo (Live GAA) is the principal Gaelic games programme of Irish language-broadcaster TG4.

Typically, it is shown on TG4 on a regular basis on Saturday and Sunday afternoons, as well as midweek, all year round showing live and deferred coverage of hurling and Gaelic football matches in the club championships, National Leagues, Fitzgibbon Cup and Sigerson Cup, as well as the provincial and All-Ireland Championships at minor, under-20 and under-21 levels.

History

Beginnings

A week after its launch on 31 October 1996, Teilifís na Gaeilge (TnaG) broadcast its first Gaelic games-themed programme. Ard san Aer, a weekly studio-based programme presented by Cynthia Ní Mhurchú, featured special guests who discussed their favourite sporting memories. The programme lasted for one season.

TnaG's first foray into live Gaelic games broadcasting occurred over the June Bank Holiday weekend in 1997 when the fledgling station provided five hours of coverage of the Comórtas Peile na Gaeltachta.

Ard san Aer returned with a new format in October 1998. Mícheál Ó Domhnaill, who previously presented the Spanish football programme Olé, Olé, presented the new version of the programme. Broadcast on Wednesday evenings, the programme initially featured highlights of the previous weekends' games in the club championships and National Leagues. The programme was later expanded to feature highlights of inter-county championship games during the summer months.

The first live edition of Ard san Aer Beo was broadcast on 3 October 1999 and featured coverage of the Offaly Senior Hurling Championship final between Birr and St. Rynagh's.

Development

Ard san Aer Beo proved to be an instant success due to the fact that TG4's television rivals did not show live broadcasts of club championship or National League games. In 1999 the programme underwent a re-branding and was renamed GAA Beo, however, Ard san Aer remained as the name of the mid-week highlights programme. The first edition of the newly-styled GAA Beo was broadcast on TG4 on 17 September 2000 and showed live coverage of the Meath Senior Football Championship final between Dunshaughlin and Kilmainhamwood.

Coverage

Games from the following competitions are regularly shown on GAA Beo:

 National Football League
 National Hurling League
 Christy Ring Cup
 Nicky Rackard Cup
 Lory Meagher Cup
 All-Ireland Under-21 Football Championship
 All-Ireland Under-21 Hurling Championship
 Leinster Under-21 Hurling Championship
 Munster Under-21 Hurling Championship
 All-Ireland Minor Football Championship
 All-Ireland Minor Hurling Championship
 All-Ireland Senior Club Football Championship
 Connacht Senior Club Football Championship
 Leinster Senior Club Football Championship
 Munster Senior Club Football Championship
 Ulster Senior Club Football Championship
 All-Ireland Senior Club Hurling Championship
 Leinster Senior Club Hurling Championship
 Munster Senior Club Hurling Championship
 County Senior Football Championships
 County Senior Hurling Championships
 Sigerson Cup
 Fitzgibbon Cup
 Comórtas Peile na Gaeltachta

References

1990s Irish television series
2000s Irish television series
2010s Irish television series
Gaelic games on television
TG4 original programming